Daliah Saper is an American intellectual property, internet, entertainment and business attorney. She founded the Chicago law firm Saper Law Offices in 2005. She is also an adjunct professor at Loyola University Chicago School of Law.

As a media personality 
Saper appears regularly on television news programs such as Fox News, CNBC, ABC News, and Bloomberg to provide commentary on internet law. Additionally, Saper has been featured in digital publications including The New York Times, The Chicago Tribune, The Chicago Sun-Times, Wired, and Advertising Age.

Daliah was a featured speaker at SXSW 2017.

Notable cases 
Bonhomme v. St. James

In 2012, Saper represented Paula Bonhomme, a Los Angeles resident who was seduced by a fake social media account created by Illinois resident Janna St. James. Bonhomme eventually sued St. James for emotional distress and fraud. The case, which was argued before the Illinois Supreme Court, attracted widespread media attention.

Accolades 
In 2012, Saper was selected as a "40 Under 40" attorney by Law Bulletin Publishing Company. She has been named a "rising star" by Super Lawyers Magazine each year since 2009. Saper was a featured speaker at SXSW 2017 and the NYC Porn Film Festival 2016, discussing revenge porn litigation at both events.

References

American lawyers
Intellectual property lawyers
Internet law
Entertainment lawyers
Living people
Loyola University Chicago School of Law faculty
Year of birth missing (living people)